No Deposit (sometimes stylized as No Depo$it) is a 2015 Canadian drama film written and directed by and starring Frank D'Angelo.

Plot

Cast
 Frank D'Angelo as Jimmy Valenti
 Michael Paré as Mickey Ryan
 Peter Coyote as Police Chief Williams
 Robert Loggia as Sydney Fischer
 Paul Sorvino as Alfie
 Doris Roberts as Kat Nugent
 Michael Madsen as Peter Shay
 Daniel Baldwin as Bryan Canning
 Eric Roberts as Gerry Gaci
 Margot Kidder as Margie Ryan
 Tony Nardi as Detective Vincent Scartelli
 Art Hindle as Joseph Ryan
 Ellen Dubin as Judy Ryan
 Laurie Fortier as Angie Vanenti
 Tony Rosato as Detective Tony Charkoff
 Maria del Mar as Maureen Ryan
 Sean McCann as Hostage Negotiator
 Diane Salinger as Gloria Markovitz
 Dominique Swain as Girl In Bar

References

External links
 
 
 

2015 films
Canadian drama films
English-language Canadian films
Films directed by Frank D'Angelo
2010s English-language films
2010s Canadian films